Laff Camera Action is a 2016 Philippine television comedy game show broadcast by GMA Network. Hosted by Betong Sumaya and Sheena Halili, it premiered on May 28, 2016 on the network's Sabado Star Power sa Hapon line up replacing CelebriTV. Sef Cadayona, Gladys Guevarra and Caesar Cosme served as the members of "MapanghusGANG". The show concluded on August 27, 2016 with a total of 16 episodes. It was replaced by Hashtag Like in its timeslot.

Overview
A 60-minute improvisational comedy game show where performances are unscripted, unrehearsed, and spontaneous.

Two groups of  three celebrities or comedians will compete in three rounds as they tackle various improvisational scenarios.

A special guest is also invited to perform with the competing groups.

Gameplay
In the game proper, two sets of groups with three contestants will compete. They will play an unscripted, unrehearsed, and spontaneous comedic role play with different scenes given by various ComeDirectors each week. At the end of the show, the MapanghusGANG will give comments regarding to their performance and will decide who will be the winner of the week.

In round one, They will do a funny roleplay with a scene given to them by the selected ComeDirector of the week. The two groups will have a different set of scenes and props that will help them make their roleplay more pretentious.

In round two, They should give most of their efforts to make their performance even more pretentious. They still differ about the scene but they won't have props and will now had a special guest performer also known as the ContraDiva or ContraBibo.

In round 3, since the last, the fight would be more thrilling! They have to give their very best because first and foremost, they will use same scenes and props. But the other group would be in the isolation room so that they couldn't spy the other group's performance.

The best performer will get Php 10,000 while the Grand Winner will get Php 75,000 in cash, and a L.C.A. trophy. Another milestone for a defending champion is that when their team won continuing three times, they would have a star that would be placed in the Wall of Fame.

Hosts

 Betong Sumaya
 Sheena Halili
 Arianne Bautista

MapanghusGANG
 Sef Cadayona
 Gladys Guevarra
 Caesar Cosme

Ratings
According to AGB Nielsen Philippines' Mega Manila household television ratings, the pilot episode of Laff, Camera, Action! earned a 12.3% rating. While the final episode scored an 11.5 rating in Urban Luzon television ratings.

Accolades

References

External links
 

2016 Philippine television series debuts
2016 Philippine television series endings
Filipino-language television shows
GMA Network original programming
Philippine game shows